Phymatioderus bizonatus is a species of beetle in the family Cerambycidae, the only species in the genus Phymatioderus.

References

Hesperophanini